Ramón Alfredo Fagoaga Romero (born 12 January 1952) is a former Salvadoran footballer.

Club career
Despite suffering from asthma, Fagoaga started playing at the Pipiles youth team and when turned professional he played as a striker for Dragón in the Salvadoran second division. When he later joined Atlético Marte he was made a central defender since Marte already had seven strikers in the squad.

International career
Fagoaga was a member of the El Salvador team at the 1982 World Cup in Spain and represented his country in 23 FIFA World Cup qualification matches. He played 105 matches for his country including non-official ones.

Retirement
In 2006 Fagoaga was named temporary manager of FESFUT, the Salvadoran Football Association.

Honours
Primera División de Fútbol de El Salvador: 3
 1980–1981 Clausura, 1982 Clausura, 1985 Clausura (C.D. Atlético Marte)

CONCACAF Champions League Runners-up
 1981 (C.D. Atlético Marte)

References

External links
Me multaban si el mágico González no llegaba a entrenar - Elfaro.net 

1952 births
Living people
People from San Miguel, El Salvador
Salvadoran footballers
El Salvador international footballers
1982 FIFA World Cup players
C.D. Atlético Marte footballers
Association football defenders
C.D. Dragón footballers